Tita Bell is an American television soap opera writer. Besides working on soap operas, Bell also wrote a scenario for a Bednaya Nastya in 2003, and had a recurring role as Trudy on Happy Days from 1974 to 1977.

Positions held
The City
 Script Writer: November 13, 1995 – March 28, 1997

Guiding Light
 Writer: July 24, 2007 – September 18, 2009
 Script Writer: 1997 – April 2003, September 2004 – July 23, 2007

Awards and nominations
Daytime Emmy Award
Win, 2007, Best Writing, Guiding Light
Nomination, 1999, 2003 & 2005, Best Writing, Guiding Light

Writers Guild of America Award
Win, 2004, Best Writing, Guiding Light
Nomination, 1997, 1998, 2001, 2002 & 2006, Best Writing, Guiding Light

External links

American soap opera writers
American television actresses
Living people
Writers Guild of America Award winners
American women television writers
Women soap opera writers
Year of birth missing (living people)
21st-century American women